Ysyk-Ata Resort (Kyrgyz: Ысык-Ата курорту) is a balneoclimatic resort located at the north slope of Kyrgyz Ala-Too, at the altitude of 1775 m above sea level. The resort features a relief of a Tibetan medicinal Buddha and Tibetan inscriptions dated from the eighth to tenth century CE, with a much later carving of Lenin added to the side.

References

Resorts in Kyrgyzstan